The Scrolls of Abraham (Ṣuḥuf ʾIbrāhīm) are a part of the religious scriptures of Islam. These scriptures are believed to have contained the revelations of Abraham received from God, which were written down by him as well as his scribes and followers.

Background
In two surah (chapters), which are dated from the first Meccan period, there is a reference to the 'Leaves, Scrolls, Journals' (Suhuf) of Abraham (and the Scrolls of Moses), by which presumably certain divinely inspired texts handwritten by the patriarchs are meant.  These passages say that the truth of God's message is present in the earliest revelations, of Abraham and Moses.  Although Suhuf is generally understood to mean 'Scrolls', many translators - including Abdullah Yusuf Ali and Marmaduke Pickthall - have translated the verse as "The Books of Abraham and Moses".

Qur'anic mention
The Quran refers to certain Scrolls of Abraham, which have alternatively been translated as the Books of Abraham. All Muslim scholars have generally agreed that no scrolls of Abraham survive today, and therefore this is a reference to a lost body of scripture. The Scrolls of Abraham are understood by Muslims to refer to certain revelations Abraham received, which he would have then transmitted to writing. The exact contents of the revelation are not described in the Quran.

The 87th chapter of the Quran, surah Al-Ala, concludes saying the subject matter of the surah has been in the earlier scriptures of Abraham and Moses. It is slightly indicative of what were in the previous scriptures, according to Islam:

Chapter 53 of the Quran, surah An-Najm mentions some more subject matters of the earlier scriptures of Abraham and Moses.

Identification
Some scholars suggest the Scrolls of Abraham to be a reference to the Sefer Yetzirah, as its appendix (vi. 15) and Jewish tradition generally ascribe the reception of its revelation to Abraham. Other scholars, however, suggest it refers to the Testament of Abraham, which was also available at the time of Muhammad (Muḥammad ibn ʿAbdullāh).  
   
The Quran contains numerous references to Abraham, his life, prayers and traditions and has a dedicated chapter named Ibrahim (14). On a relevant note, surah Al-Kahf (18) was revealed as an answer from God to the Jews who asked Muhammad about past events. Here God directly instructed Muhammad in surah Al-Kahf (18:22), not to consult the Jews for verifying the three stories about which they inquired.

The reason being God declaring He Himself is relating what needs to be verified in another verse of surah Al-Kahf (18:13)

Regarding consultation with the People of the Book, it is also narrated by Abu Hureyrah in hadith literature:

   
Therefore, in this view, Muslims would not be required to ascribe to the Sefer Yetzirah, even were it to be identified as the Scrolls of Abraham. However, Muslim theology already accepts Jewish sources such as the Torah (Tawrat) as revealed to Moses (Musa) or the Psalms (Zabur) as revealed to David (Dawud), though asserting Quranic precedence in the event of conflicting accounts.

See also 
 Book of Abraham

Notes

References

Further reading

Jewish Encyclopedia bibliography
Editions and translations:
Editio princeps:
Mantua, 1562; HebrewBooks.org Sefer Detail: ספר יצירה -- מיוחס לאברהם אבינו
other important editions:
Amsterdam, 1642;
Zolkiev, 1745;
Korzec, 1779;
Constantinople, 1791;
Grodno, 1806 (five commentaries); Sefer Detail: ספר יצירה -- ספר יצירה. תקס"ו. הורדנה.
Warsaw, 1884 (nine commentaries);
Goldschmidt, Das Buch der Schöpfung . . . Kritisch Redigirter Text, Frankfort-on-the-Main, 1894 (the edition, however, by no means represents a critical text).
Translations:
Latin:
Postell, Abraham Patriarchœ Liber Iezirah, Paris, 1552;
Pistor, Liber Iezirah, in Ars Cabalistica, Basel, 1557;
Rittangel in the Amsterdam edition of 1642;
German:
Johann F. von Meyer, Das Buch Yezira, Leipsic, 1830;
English:
I. Kalisch, A Sketch of the Talmud, New York City, 1877;
W. W. Westcott, Sepher Yezirah, London, 1893;
French:
Karppe, Etude sur les Origines . . . du Zohar, pp. 139–158, Paris, 1901.
Literature:
Castelli, Il Commento di Sabbatai Donnolo, Florence, 1880;
Epstein, Studien zum Jezira-Buche, in Monatsschrift, xxxvii.;
idem, Pseudo-Saadia, ib.;
idem, Recherches sur le Sefer Yeçira, in R. E. J. xxviii.-xxix. (both articles also published separately);
idem, in Monatsschrift, xxxix. 46–48, 134–136;
Grätz, Gnosticismus und Judenthum, pp. 102–132, Breslau, 1846;
Franck, La Kabbale, pp. 53–66, 102–118, Paris, 1843 (German translation by Jellinek, pp. 57–65, Leipsic, 1844);
Hamburger, R. B. T. Supplement, iii. 98-102;
Jellinek, Beiträge, i. 3-16;
Rosenthal, in Keneset Yisrael, ii. 29–68;
Steinschneider, in Berliner's Magazin, xix. 79–85;
idem, Cat. Bodl. cols. 552–554;
Zedner, Cat. Hebr. Books Brit. Mus. p. 13;
Fürst, Bibl. Jud. i. 27–28;
Bacher, Die Anfänge der Hebräischen Grammatik, pp. 20–23, Leipsic, 1895.

Islamic texts
Abraham in Islam